Muhammad Tegh Ali  or Sarkar-e-Surkanhi was a saint of the Qadri Sufi order in the Indian subcontinent.

Khanqhe Abadaniya
Finally, he returned to his native and shifted to Surkanhi Sharif and established a center of education and Sufism. There, a Khanqah Abadania and Madarsa Alimia were established. While in his life, he spread all his teachings to the people and taught them what he regarded as the correct way to preach Islam by doing tabliqh.

Death
Tegh Ali died on 1 Rabi' al-thani 1378 (14 October 1958) at 6:35 pm. His kabr-e-anwar is located just behind the khanqah.

See also 
Islam in India
Sufism in India

References

External links
 Info
 Data

Indian Sufi saints
People from Bihar
1882 births
1958 deaths